Inzele is a village in the Ouo Department of Comoé Province in south-western Burkina Faso. The village has a population of 276.

References

Populated places in the Cascades Region
Comoé Province